Cowie Hill is a community within the urban area of the Municipality of Halifax, in Nova Scotia, Canada.

History
The hill on which it is situated was originally called Cowie's Hill, named after one of the original owners of the land, Robert Cowie. In 1752, Cowie, a British merchant, was granted the land by Governor Edward Cornwallis. Over time, the apostrophe s in Cowie's Hill was dropped.

In the 1970s, the community began to urbanize. Two apartment buildings have been built since then; Armdale Place (known colloquially as Top of the Mountain), and Ridgeway Towers.

Geography

Throughout the community, there are distinctive townhouses that line narrow, one-way streets. Its main streets include Cowie Hill Road, Highfield Street, and Ridgevalley Road. Side streets include Abbey Road, Bromley Road, Cavendish Road, Drumdonald Road, Limerick Road, and Shepherd Road.

Culture
There is a large park called the J. Albert Walker Memorial Sports Field.

Demographics
The only demographic information that pertains to Cowie Hill is that there are approximately 26,500 people that live within District 9 (Halifax West Armdale). However, there is not specific demographic information for the community of Cowie Hill.

Education
Chebucto Heights Elementary School
J. L. Ilsley High School (located in Spryfield)

Transportation
Currently, there are two transit routes that traverse through the community.

Halifax Transit Routes

Route 24 (Leiblin Park)
Route 127 (Cowie Hill Express)

Political Representation
Shawn Cleary, Halifax Regional Council Councillor for District 9 (Halifax West Armdale)
Megan Leslie, Member of Parliament (New Democrat) for Halifax
Graham Steele, Member of the Legislative Assembly (NDP) for Halifax Fairview

References

A Detailed History Of Armdale Yacht Club

External links
"View from Cowie's Hill near Halifax" (1801) by I.G. Parkyns
Chebucto Heights Elementary Website

Communities in Halifax, Nova Scotia